Tat Ton National Park is a national park in Chaiyaphum Province, Thailand. The park is in the Laen Kha mountain range. It features waterfalls and mountain highland scenery. On 31 December 1980, Tat Ton was designated Thailand's 23rd national park.

Geography
The park's area is 135,737 rai ~ .

The park encompasses three peaks of the Laen Kha mountains: Phu Kaset, Phu Dee, and Phu Youk.

Attractions
Other waterfalls in the park include Tat Fa, Pha Lang and Pha Song Chan.

Flora and fauna
The park's forests are dipterocarp and dry evergreen. Tree species include Shorea roxburghii, Shorea obtusa, Dipterocarpus tuberculatus, Irvingia malayana, Calophyllum polyanthum, Shorea siamensis, Xylia xylocarpa, Sindora siamensis, Garcinia celebica, Dalbergia oliveri, Memecylon ovatum and Vietnamosasa pusilla.

Animal species include barking deer, wild pig, mongoose and Siamese hare.

See also
List of national parks of Thailand
List of Protected Areas Regional Offices of Thailand

References

National parks of Thailand
Geography of Chaiyaphum province
Tourist attractions in Chaiyaphum province
1980 establishments in Thailand
Protected areas established in 1980